Robinson Ekspeditionen 2019 is the twenty-first season of the Danish version of the Swedish reality television series Expedition Robinson. This season, twenty-two contestants are taken to the Philippines where, for the first time since 2015, two tribes compete against each other to win challenges and immunity. After forty-four days, one of them will win and become this year's Robinson winner. The season premiered on 26 August 2019.

Finishing order

References

External links

Robinson Ekspeditionen seasons
2019 Danish television seasons